Jimmy Zakazaka (born 27 December 1984) is a Malawian football (soccer) player who has played at international level for Malawi. His position is striker. Clubs he has played for include Free State Stars and Bay United.

International goals

References

External links

1984 births
Living people
Malawian footballers
2010 Africa Cup of Nations players
Association football forwards
Free State Stars F.C. players
Malawian expatriate footballers
Nyasa Big Bullets FC players
Thanda Royal Zulu F.C. players
Malawian expatriate sportspeople in South Africa
Expatriate soccer players in South Africa
Bay United F.C. players
Malawi international footballers